Ishwardas Rohani (30 June 1946 – 5 November 2013) was an Indian politician of Bharatiya Janata Party.  He was born on 30 June 1946 in Karachi. He was elected to the assembly from Jabalpur. He has been the Assembly Speaker of the Madhya Pradesh Legislative Assembly, since 2003. He was the Deputy Speaker from 1998 to 2003.

Personal life 
Mr. Rohani was born in Karachi in 1946. He migrated with his family to Jabalpur during the Partition, a year later. His son Ashok Rohani is an active and famous politician in Jabalpur, India.

Political career 
Mr. Rohani joined the Bharatiya Jan Sangh in 1965 and was elected to the Jabalpur Municipal Corporation in 1973. He was detained under the Maintenance of Internal Security Act during The Emergency. He was elected Deputy Speaker in 1998 and served as speaker from 2003 until his death.

Death 
Ishwardas Rohani died of cardiac arrest on 5 November 2013. He was 67.

References

mpvidhansabha
Biography of Ishwardas Rohani

1946 births
People from Jabalpur
Speakers of the Madhya Pradesh Legislative Assembly
Madhya Pradesh MLAs 1998–2003
Madhya Pradesh MLAs 2003–2008
Politicians from Karachi
2013 deaths
Deputy Speakers of the Madhya Pradesh Legislative Assembly
Bharatiya Janata Party politicians from Madhya Pradesh